Airplane is an EP released in 1998 by Rusted Root.

Track listing
 "Airplane"
 "Agbadza"
 "Martyr (Live)"
 "Laugh As The Sun (Live)"
 "Away From"
 "Indigo: Music For Exploration And Evolution"

References

Rusted Root albums
1998 EPs